The Lebanon Patriot, now defunct, was an American newspaper published weekly at Lebanon, Ohio, the seat of Warren County.   The paper was founded by General Durbin Ward as a Democratic paper and first published on January 16, 1868.  Warren County being ardently Republican, the paper was to take the place of the previous Democratic paper in the county, the Democratic Citizen, which was destroyed by a mob at the outbreak of the Civil War.  Ward sold the paper to Edward Warwick who sold it to A. A. Roland (born February 11, 1853) in April 1878.  Circa 1883 it was owned and edited by Mary V. Proctor Wilson.  The paper was last issued in December 1936 when it merged with The Western Star, another weekly in Lebanon.  The combined paper was published as The Western Star and Lebanon Patriot from January 7, 1937, to June 30, 1938.

References
This article was compiled from the catalog records of the newspaper in the OCLC database with information from the History of Warren County, Ohio (Chicago, Illinois: W.H. Beers, 1883) and The Centennial Atlas and History of Warren County, Ohio (Lebanon, Ohio:  The Centennial Atlas Association, 1903).

Defunct newspapers published in Ohio
Mass media in Warren County, Ohio